Rosenska Pokalen 1902, part of the 1902 Swedish football season, was the fourth Rosenska Pokalen tournament played. 16 teams participated and 15 matches were played, the first 14 August 1902 and the last 7 September 1902. Gefle IF won the tournament ahead of runners-up Djurgårdens IF.

Participating clubs

Tournament results 
1st round

Quarter-finals

Semi-finals

Final

Notes

References 

Print

1902
Ros